Deep Sea Recovery Efforts is the second studio album by American musician and former Blue's Clues host Steve Burns.

Track listings

References

2009 albums
Steve Burns albums